or Hiwa Natural Science Museum is a museum of the natural sciences in Shōbara, Hiroshima Prefecture, Japan.

History
Initially located on the premises of Hiwa Junior School, the Museum became a museum-equivalent facility and then a registered museum in 1952. In 1956, it relocated to the premises of the Prefectural Shōbara Vocational High School, Hiwa Branch; then, after deregistration in 1958, in 1962 to the premises of the Hiwa Chūō Kōminkan. In 1989, with the demolition of the public hall, the Museum temporarily closed its doors while work began on the construction of a new dedicated facility. A "Discovery Room" and storage facility was added to the complex in 2001, and in 2005 the Museum again became a registered museum. In 2012, the earth sciences and geology annex opened.

Publications
  (1958—)

See also
 Hiroshima Prefectural Museum of History

References

External links
  Hiwa Museum of Natural History

Shōbara, Hiroshima
Museums in Hiroshima Prefecture
Museums established in 1951
1951 establishments in Japan
Natural history museums in Japan